Earthquake is a 2016 Russian-Armenian drama film directed by Sarik Andreasyan about the 1988 Armenian earthquake. It was selected as the Armenian entry for the Best Foreign Language Film at the 89th Academy Awards. However, the film was disqualified by the Academy for not meeting the submission requirements.

Cast
 Sebastien Sisak as Didier, a cynologist
 Sabina Akhmedova as Gayane
 Konstantin Lavronenko as Konstantin Berezhnoy
 Artyom Bystrov as a hoistman
 Arsen Grigoryan as Ryzhiy
 Mariya Mironova as Anna Berezhnaya
 Michael Poghosian as Erem
 Artyom Bystrov as Grisha

Box office
According to Box Office Mojo, Earthquake grossed $3.6 million in Russia and ex-Soviet countries, against a budget of RUB 200,000,000 (approximately $3.3 million in 2016), according to Kinopoisk.

Reception
Critical reception of the film in Russian media ranged from mixed to positive. Earthquake had the best critical reception of all films directed by Sarik Andreasyan.

See also
 List of submissions to the 89th Academy Awards for Best Foreign Language Film
 List of Armenian submissions for the Academy Award for Best Foreign Language Film

References

External links
 

2016 films
2016 multilingual films
2016 drama films
2010s disaster films
Armenian-language films
Russian drama films
2010s Russian-language films
Russian multilingual films
Armenian multilingual films
Armenian drama films
Russian disaster films